Ball is an English surname that has multiple potential origins, as do many short surnames:
 one origin suggests that Ball is a shortened form, a "favorite contraction", of the given name Baldwin, dating "from Norman times"
 another purported origin is related to living near a "knoll or rounded hill"
 the surname may also descend from the Old Norse personal name "Balle"
 it could be a toponymic surname, related to Ball, Cornwall, England

According to Bowman, Ball and related names had only "limited application as personal names and that generally they have come into existence as nicknames."

List of people with the surname

Arts and music
see Writing and education below for writers
Alan Ball (screenwriter) (born 1957)
Angeline Ball (born 1969), actor
Ashleigh Ball (voice actress) (born 1983), Canadian voice actor and musician
Christopher Ball (born 1936), British composer
David Ball (electronic musician) (born 1959), English electronic musician (usually known as Dave), member of Soft Cell, The Grid
David Ball (country singer) (born 1953), American country singer
Dave Ball (guitarist) (1950–2015), guitarist formerly of Procol Harum, Bedlam, Long John Baldry, etc.
 Dave "Taif" Ball, British bass guitarist with metal bands Killing Joke and Voodoocult
Ed Ball (musician) (born 1959), English singer-songwriter, musician and businessman
Estil C. Ball (1913—1978), American folk musician
John Ball (musician) (born 1990), American Christian musician
Kenny Ball (1930–2013), English jazz musician
 Kirshnik Ball (1994-2022), American rapper known professionally as Takeoff (name is also written as "Kirsnick" as, for example, in ASCAP's repertory)
Lucille Ball (1911–1989), American comedian and actor
Marcia Ball (born 1949), American blues singer and pianist
Martin Ball (born 1964), English actor
Martin J. Ball (born 1951), Welsh professor
Matthew Ball (born 1993), English ballet dancer
Michael Ball (singer) (born 1962), English actor and singer
Roger Ball (designer), industrial designer
Nicholas Ball (actor) (born 1946), English actor
Robert Ball (artist) (1918–2008), British artist
Bobby Ball (1944–2020), English comedian
Thomas Ball (artist) (1819–1911), American sculptor
Walter Ball (cartoonist) (1911–1995)
Wilfrid Ball (1853–1917), British painter
William Ball (stage director), American stage director (1931–1991)
Zoë Ball (born 1970), English radio and television personality

Business
Jeremy J. Ball (born 1973), restaurateur, hotelier, entertainment complex management
Decimus Alfred Ball (1836—1890), British slumlord
Edmund Ball (1855–1925), American entrepreneur, one of the Ball Brothers
Edward Ball (businessman) (1888–1981), American businessman and political figure
Ernie Ball (1930–2004), American entrepreneur, musician, and guitar innovator
Frank Ball (1857–1943), American entrepreneur, one of the Ball Brothers
Harvey Ball (1921–2001), American entrepreneur; earliest known designer of the Smiley

Media
 Dave Ball, Survivor: Samoa competitor
Johnny Ball (born 1938), English children's television presenter
Krystal Ball (born 1981), American political pundit, co-host of Breaking Points Krystal & Saagar 
Molly Ball, American political journalist and writer

Military
Albert Ball (1896–1917), English World War I fighter pilot; recipient of the Victoria Cross
Alexander Ball (–1809), English admiral of the Royal Navy and Governor of Malta
Henry Lidgbird Ball (1756–1818), British Royal Navy officer who discovered and explored Lord Howe Island
William L. Ball III (born 1948), United States Secretary of the Navy

Politics, law, and diplomacy
Bartholomew Ball (died 1573), Mayor of Dublin 1553-1554
Edward Ball (congressman) (1811–1872), American national politician
Frank Livingston Ball (1885–1966), American state politician
Gregory R. Ball (born 1977), American state politician
Hiram J. Ball (1832-1908), American state politician and farmer
John Ball (16th-century MP) (1518–1556), English Member of Parliament (MP) for Norwich
John Ball (assemblyman) (1756–1838), American soldier and politician
John Thomas Ball (1815–1898), Irish barrister and politician, MP for Dublin University 1868–1875
Joseph H. Ball (1905–1993), American journalist and national politician
L. Heisler Ball (1861–1932), American physician and national politician
Mottrom D. Ball (1835–1887), American government official
Nicholas Ball (Alderman) (died 1609), Mayor of Dublin 1582–1583
Nicholas Ball (Irish lawyer) (died 1865), Irish barrister
Robert James Ball (1857–1928), Canadian politician
Thomas Henry Ball (1859–1944), American national politician
Thomas R. Ball (1896–1943), U.S. Representative from Connecticut
Walter Ball (Alderman) (died 1598), Mayor of Dublin 1580-1581
Whitney Lynn Ball (1962-2015), American philanthropist 
William Lee Ball (1781-1824), Virginia congressman
William Macmahon Ball (1901–1986), Australian academic and diplomat

Religion
David Ball (bishop) (1926–2017), Episcopal bishop of Albany, NY
David Standish Ball (1926-2017), American Episcopal bishop
John Ball (bishop) (1934–2016), British Anglican bishop
John Ball (clergyman) (before 1760 – after 1795), African-American minister from Nova Scotia
John Ball (minister) (1665–1745), English Presbyterian minister
John Ball (priest) ( 1338 – 1381), English radical priest and leader of 1381 Peasants' Revolt
Margaret Ball (1515–1584), beatified by the Roman Catholic Church as martyr of the faith
Michael Ball (bishop) (born 1932), English Anglican clergyman; former Bishop of Truro
Peter Ball (bishop) (1932–2019), disgraced former Bishop of Lewes and twin brother of Michael Ball

Sciences and mathematics
Alice Ball (1892-1916), chemist; invented the Ball Method for treating leprosy
Benjamin Ball (physician) (1833–1893), English-born French psychiatrist
Catherine Ball, English-Australian businesswomen involved in making drones
Elmer Darwin Ball (1870–1943), American entomologist
Ernest Aubrey Ball (1909–1997), American botanist
George Ball (entomologist) (1926-2019), American entomologist
John M. Ball (born 1948), British mathematician
John Ball (cognitive scientist) (born 1963), American cognitive scientist
John Ball (geologist) (1872–1941), English geologist
John Ball (naturalist) (1818–1889), Irish naturalist and politician, MP for County Carlow 1857–1880
Keith Martin Ball (born 1960), English mathematician
Leo Anton Karl de Ball (1853–1916), German-Austrian astronomer
Loren C. Ball (born 1948), American astronomer
Mary Ball (1812–1892), Irish naturalist and entomologist
Peter William Ball (born 1932), English-born Canadian botanist
Robert Ball (naturalist) (1802–1857), Irish naturalist
Robert Stawell Ball (1840–1913), Irish astronomer
W. W. Rouse Ball (1850–1925), British mathematician
Webb C. Ball (1847–1922), American railroad engineer who established the first rules for railroad chronometers
William Ball (astronomer) (or Balle), British astronomer; founder Fellow of the Royal Society

Sports
Alan Ball Jr. (1945–2007), English professional footballer and football club manager
Alan Ball Sr. (1924–1982), English professional footballer and football club manager
Alan Ball (American football) (born 1985)
Alan Ball (weightlifter) (born 1943), American Olympic weightlifter
Alf Ball (footballer, born 1890) (1890–1952), English footballer
Alf Ball (footballer, born 1873) (1873–1940), English footballer
Allan Ball (1943–2018), English footballer with Queen of the South
Arnie Ball (born 1944), American volleyball coach; father of Lloy Ball (below)
Ashleigh Ball (field hockey) (born 1986), English field hockey player
Bobby Ball (racing driver) (1925–1954), American racing driver
Carsten Ball (born 1987), Australian tennis player
Catie Ball (born 1951), American Olympic swimmer
Chris Ball (born 1963), American football coach and former player
Dave Ball (defensive end) (born 1981), American football player
David Ball (footballer) (born 1989), English footballer
David Ball (wide receiver) (born 1984), American football player
David Ball (sport shooter), British sport shooter
Eric Ball (American football) (born 1966), American football player
Jeff Ball (baseball) (born 1969), baseball player
John Ball (golfer) (1861–1940), English amateur golfer; winner of The Open Championship 
Jack Ball (footballer, born 1900) (1900–1989), English footballer for Bury and England
Jack Ball (footballer, born 1907) (1907–1976), English football forward
Jack Ball (footballer, born 1923) (1923–1999), English football goalkeeper
John Ball (footballer, born 1925) (1925–1998), English footballer for Bolton Wanderers
John Ball (soccer) (born 1972), American footballer for Rochester Rhinos
Josh Ball (born 1998), American football player
Kevin Ball (born 1964), soccer player
 A family of American sportspeople:
LaVar Ball (born 1968), football player, father of the following basketball players:
Lonzo Ball (born 1997)
LiAngelo Ball (born 1998)
LaMelo Ball (born 2001)
Lloy Ball (born 1972), American volleyball player
Luke Ball (born 1984), Australian rules footballer
Michael Ball (American football) (born 1964), American football player
Michael Ball (footballer) (born 1979), English professional footballer
Montee Ball (born 1990), American professional football player
Neal Ball (1881-1957), baseball player
Neiron Ball (1992-2019), American football player
Phil Ball (American football) (1925–2008), college football coach
Phil Ball (baseball) (1864–1932), owner of the St. Louis Terriers
Rachel Ball (born 1991), English boxer
Reggie Ball (born 1984), American professional football player
Robert Ball (bowls) (born 1956), Australian lawn bowler
Robert Ball (judoka) (born 1964), Australian judoka
Rudi Ball (1910–1975), German-South African; only athlete of Jewish descent to represent Germany in the 1936 Winter Olympic Games; Hall of Fame
Sam Ball (born 1944), NFL lineman
Walter Ball (baseball player) (1877–1946), Negro league baseball player
William Ball (footballer), English footballer (1886–1942)

Writing and education
 Catherine Ball, known as the Baroness de Calabrella (–1856), British writer and newspaper owner
Clifford Ball (1908-1947), author
David W. Ball (born 1949), American novelist
Donna Ball (born 1951), writer
Edward Ball (American author) (born 1959)
 Franklin R. Ball (born 1931), American author and adventurer
Hugo Ball (1886–1927), German author and poet
Isabel Worrell Ball (1855–1931), American journalist and editor
John Ball (Puritan) (1585–1640), English author and scholar
John Ball (pioneer) (1794–1884), American explorer
John Ball (novelist) (1911–1988), American novelist
Phil Ball (writer) (born 1957), British writer based in Spain
Philip Ball (born 1962), English science writer
Samuel Ball (educator) (1935–2009), Australian education researcher

Other
 Edward Hughes Ball (1798–1863), later Edward Hughes Ball Hughes or "The Golden Ball", British dandy
Helen Ball, senior British police officer
Martha Violet Ball (1811–1894), American educator, philanthropist, activist, writer, editor
Mary Ball Washington (1706–1789) mother of George Washington
Robert M. Ball (1914–2008), American Social Security official
Robert W. Ball (born 1943), Canadian naval architect
Ron Ball (born 1950), British Police and Crime Commissioner
William Ball (suffragist) (born 1862), British workers union member, jailed and force-fed for his support of women's suffrage

See also
Ball
Ball (disambiguation)
 Human name disambiguation pages: Alan Ball (disambiguation), David Ball (disambiguation), John Ball (disambiguation), Phil Ball (disambiguation), Robert Ball (disambiguation)

Notes

Further reading
 
 

English-language surnames